van Rensburg is a surname. Notable people with the surname include:

Andre van Rensburg (born 1976), South African avant-garde composer, producer and instrumentalist
Christo van Rensburg (born 1962), former professional tennis player from South Africa
Francois van Rensburg (born 1964), Namibian former rugby union footballer
Johannes Van Rensburg (1898–1966), South African leader of the Ossewabrandwag
Johnny van Rensburg (1932–2010), South African boxer of the 1950s and '60s
Jurinus Janse van Rensburg SD SM MMM (born 1952), South African military commander
Kobie van Rensburg (born 1969), South African tenor and opera director
Johannes Jacobus (Lang Hans) Janse van Rensburg (1779–1836), leader of a failed voortrekker expedition
Nico van Rensburg (born 1966), South African professional golfer
Patrick van Rensburg (1931–2017), African educationalist and former anti-apartheid activist
Reinardt Janse van Rensburg (born 1989), South African cyclist
Rhyno Janse van Rensburg, (born 1991), South African cricketer
Shawn van Rensburg, former Wales international rugby union player
Siener van Rensburg (1862–1926), Boer prophet from the South African Republic
Willem Cornelis Janse van Rensburg (1818–1865), the Second President of the South African Republic, from 1863 to 1864
William G. L. Janse van Rensburg (1939–2008), mayor of the city of Johannesburg, South Africa, from 1990 to 1991

See also
Janse van Rensburg
Rensburg, a city in Gauteng, South Africa (near Heidelberg)

Surnames of Dutch origin
Afrikaans-language surnames